Paradoxical Frog is the eponymous debut album by a collective trio consisting of Kris Davis on piano, Ingrid Laubrock on tenor sax and Tyshawn Sorey on drums. It was recorded in 2009 and released on the Portuguese Clean Feed label.

Reception
In his review for JazzTimes Josef Woodard says that, "the trio presents a colorful and convincing example of post-free jazz, mixing intricate rhythmic notions, introspective musings and moments of cathartic release."

The All About Jazz review by Chris May notes that, "Despite its instrumentation, a good portion of the album is reminiscent of piano/bass/drums trio The Necks at its most spacious and unhurried."

The Point of Departure review by Troy Collins states, "The simultaneous release of Pool School and Paradoxical Frog make a strong case for Ingrid Laubrock as a major new player worthy of extra attention, and is a testament to the creative diversity of the Downtown scene and Clean Feed's efforts to document it."

Track listing
 "Iron Spider" (Davis) – 4:43
 "Paradoxical Frog" (Laubrock) – 11:50 
 "Slow Burn" (Sorey) – 14:22
 "Canines" (Laubrock) – 9:12
 "Homograph" (Sorey) – 12:38
 "Ghost Machine" (Davis) – 5:16
 "On the Six" (Sorey) – 4:01
 "Feldman" (Davis) – 13:22

Personnel
Kris Davis – piano
Ingrid Laubrock – tenor sax
Tyshawn Sorey – drums

References

 

2010 albums
Kris Davis albums
Ingrid Laubrock albums
Clean Feed Records albums